Allied Command Operations (ACO) is one of the two strategic commands of the North Atlantic Treaty Organization (NATO), the other being Allied Command Transformation (ACT). The headquarters and commander of ACO is Supreme Headquarters Allied Powers Europe (SHAPE) and Supreme Allied Commander Europe (SACEUR), respectively.

Structure

Under ACO, there are three Strategic Level Commands and three tactical level commands:

Strategic Level Commands:
 Allied Joint Force Command Brunssum (JFCBS), Netherlands
 Allied Joint Force Command Naples (JFCNP), Italy
 Joint Force Command Norfolk (JFC-NF), United States

Tactical Level commands:
 Allied Air Command (AIRCOM) at Ramstein, Germany
 Allied Land Command (LANDCOM) at Izmir, Turkey
 Allied Maritime Command (MARCOM) at Northwood, United Kingdom

Other commands:
 Naval Striking and Support Forces NATO (aka. Strike Force NATO, STRIKFORNATO) at Oeiras, Portugal
 NATO Communication and Information Systems Command (NCISG) at Mons, Belgium
 Joint Support and Enabling Command in Ulm, Germany

Joint Force Command Norfolk

Joint Force Command Norfolk (JFCNF) provides a critical capability to Supreme Allied Commander Europe’s (SACEUR) operational responsibilities. JFCNF was established out of the allied assessment of a changing security environment that emphasizes the trans-Atlantic as a critical domain. As an organization governed by an international memorandum of understanding (MoU), the command provides the capability to act early in a crisis to ensure a joint deterrent response and improve the responsiveness of NATO within that trans-Atlantic domain. JFCNF works seamlessly with allies and NATO partners in all domains and to provide awareness and synchronization with allies, while ensuring readiness and contributing to NATO objectives and core tasks. The NATO functions of JFCNF are related to the transition from a crisis to a high-intensity conflict. In this role, the command will contribute to enhance NATO’s warfighting capability. Established in 2018, the first JFCNF commander was Vice Admiral Andrew L. Lewis, USN who also commanded the recently re-established United States Second Fleet, also headquartered in Norfolk, Virginia; as of 2021, the JFCNF and 2nd Fleet commander is Vice Admiral Daniel W. Dwyer, USN.

Joint Support Enabling Command

SACEUR also has operational command of the Joint Support and Enabling Command.

See also
Allied Command Transformation
Operational headquarters of the European Union
Berlin Plus agreement

References

External links

Formations of the NATO Military Command Structure 1994–present
Military units and formations established in 2003